Avelis is a monotypic genus of African crab spiders containing the single species, Avelis hystriculus. It was first described by Eugène Louis Simon in 1895, and all identified species were found in the Cape Province of South Africa.

See also
 List of Thomisidae species

References

Endemic fauna of South Africa
Monotypic Araneomorphae genera
Spiders of South Africa
Thomisidae